Atli Steinarsson (30 June 1929 – 8 November 2017) was an Icelandic swimmer. He competed in the men's 200 metre breaststroke at the 1948 Summer Olympics.

References

External links
 

1929 births
2017 deaths
Atli Steinarsson
Atli Steinarsson
Swimmers at the 1948 Summer Olympics
Place of birth missing